Berk Yıldız (born 9 January 1996) is a Turkish professional footballer who plays as a midfielder for Boluspor.

Professional career
A youth product for Galatasaray, Berk made one appearance for them in a 4–1 Turkish Cup win over Adana Demirspor on 10 January 2012.

Berk transferred to Elazığspor and after a couple successful seasons moved to Yeni Malatyaspor on 10 January 2018. He made his professional debut for Malataspor in a 3–1 Süper Lig win over Kardemir Karabükspor on 25 February 2018.

On 13 July 2019, he joined Adana Demirspor on loan for two years.

On 26 January 2023, Yıldız signed a 2.5-year contract with Boluspor.

References

External links
 
 
 

1996 births
Living people
People from Konak
Turkish footballers
Turkey youth international footballers
Turkey under-21 international footballers
Association football midfielders
Süper Lig players
TFF First League players
Yeni Malatyaspor footballers
Elazığspor footballers
Galatasaray S.K. footballers
Adana Demirspor footballers
Boluspor footballers